Sebastián Emanuel González Valdéz (born March 4, 1992) is an Argentine professional footballer who plays as a midfielder for San Marcos de Arica of the Primera B Division of Chile. He played for the Argentina U-17 in the FIFA U-17 World Cup Nigeria 2009.

Teams
  San Lorenzo 2008–2013
  Unión La Calera (loan) 2012–2013
  Deportivo Cuenca 2013–2015
  Everton 2015–2017
  San Marcos de Arica 2017–present

External links
 
 

1992 births
Living people
People from Lomas de Zamora
Sportspeople from Buenos Aires Province
Argentine footballers
Association football midfielders
San Lorenzo de Almagro footballers
Unión La Calera footballers
C.D. Cuenca footballers
Everton de Viña del Mar footballers
Primera B de Chile players
Chilean Primera División players
Argentine Primera División players
Argentine expatriate footballers
Argentine expatriate sportspeople in Chile
Expatriate footballers in Chile
Argentine expatriate sportspeople in Ecuador
Expatriate footballers in Ecuador